Nestor Monge (born 7 January 1990) is a Costa Rican professional footballer who plays for Liga FPD side Guadalupe.

Career
Monge was signed to play for Valour FC in the Canadian Premier League ahead of their 2021 season but the move fell through over VISA issues. Monge rejoined his first club Pérez Zeledón FC in 2021, for the third time but left again in June, 2022. In July, 2022 Monge was signed to play for Guadalupe.

International career
Monge made his debut for the Costa Rica national football team against Jamaica on the 22 March, 2012 in Kingston, Jamaica. Monge remained on the fringes of the Costa Rica national team and made a playing return on 2 February, 2019 appearing as a substitute against the USMNT at PayPal Park in San Jose, California.

References

C.S. Cartaginés players
Costa Rica international footballers
1990 births
Living people
Costa Rican footballers
Costa Rican expatriate footballers
Association football midfielders
Liga FPD players
Liga Nacional de Fútbol de Guatemala players
Ascenso MX players
Deportivo Saprissa players
Comunicaciones F.C. players
Municipal Pérez Zeledón footballers
Potros UAEM footballers
Cafetaleros de Chiapas footballers
Costa Rican expatriate sportspeople in Guatemala
Costa Rican expatriate sportspeople in Mexico
Expatriate footballers in Guatemala
Expatriate footballers in Mexico